The 1937–38 Serie C was the third edition of Serie C, the third highest league in the Italian football league system.

Legend

Girone A

Girone B

Girone C

Girone D

Girone E

1937-1938
3
Italy